Battered corners are an architectural detail in some buildings.

Old Dutch Church (Kingston, New York) and Upper Sandy Guard Station Cabin are two U.S. National Register-listed places that have them.

External links
Framing for decorative battered wall sections, http://www.contractortalk.com webpage, with an image

Architectural elements